John G. Good, Jr. (May 17, 1926 – April 10, 2003) was a Republican member of the Pennsylvania State Senate. He was elected to represent the 47th senatorial district in a 1971 special election to fill the remaining term of Ernest P. Kline, who has been elected Lieutenant Governor of Pennsylvania.

An attorney, he resided in Beaver County, Pennsylvania, where he died in April 2003 at the age of 76.

References

1926 births
2003 deaths
Pennsylvania lawyers
Republican Party Pennsylvania state senators
People from Beaver County, Pennsylvania
Politicians from Pittsburgh
20th-century American politicians
20th-century American lawyers